Helaina Cyr (born September 5, 1996) is a Canadian Paralympic wheelchair basketball player from Edmonton, Alberta.

Biography
Cyr was born on September 5, 1996, in Edmonton, Alberta. She began playing wheelchair basketball for Alberta Northern Lights in September 2005 along with her brother Caleb. In 2010 and 2011 Women's CWBL National Championships she won 2 silver medals.

References

External links

1996 births
Living people
Paralympic wheelchair basketball players of Canada
Sportspeople from Edmonton